Otto Hooff (March 29, 1881 – December 21, 1960) was a German diver who competed in the 1904 Summer Olympics. In 1904 he finished fifth in the platform competition.

References

External links
Otto Hooff profile

1881 births
1960 deaths
German male divers
Olympic divers of Germany
Divers at the 1904 Summer Olympics